No. 37 Squadron  (Black Panthers) is a fighter squadron and was equipped with MiG-21 M and based at Jodhpur Air Force Station.

History
During the Indo-Pakistani War of 1965, this Squadron was based at Chabua, when hostilities broke out. The Squadron was given the task of launching offensive action in the Eastern Sector and of providing air defence in the Western Sector.

The squadron was number plated on an unspecified date. Currently, only 4 MiG-21 Bison squadron remains in service.

Assignments
 Invasion of Goa in 1961
 Indo-Pakistani War of 1965
 Indo-Pakistani War of 1971

Aircraft

References

037